Pierre Vassiliu (23 October 1937 – 17 August 2014) was a French singer, songwriter and actor.

His first record, "Armand", co-written with his brother Michel, appeared in 1962. It was an enormous success, selling 150,000 copies. This opened the doors of the Olympia in Paris to him, where he opened for the Beatles in 1964. He went on to a two-month stand with Françoise Hardy, Jacques Dutronc, and Johnny Hallyday. He had a string of hits, including "Charlotte", "Ivanhoe", and "La femme du sergent", censored because of the Algerian War. 

His 1973 song "Qui c'est celui-là?" was a cover of the 1972 song Partido Alto by Chico Buarque. It sold more than 300,000 copies and secured for him a place in the memories of the teenagers of the time.

With his vocal trio, he resurrected the old French song "Belle qui tiens ma vie", sung a cappella.

In 2002, he covered Boby Lapointe's "L'Été, où est-il ?" with Thallia on the album Boby Tutti-Frutti – L'hommage délicieux à Boby Lapointe by Lilicub.

In 2003, he made a CD with Senegalese griots of the Kalone Orchestra of Casamance. Vassiliu lived a part of his life in the Casamance, the region of Senegal lying to the south of the Gambia.

He died in his sleep in 2014, after years of battling Parkinson's.

References

External links 
 Website
 
 Pierre Vassiliu at Discogs.com

1937 births
2014 deaths
People from Villecresnes
French people of Romanian descent
French pop singers
French male actors
20th-century French male singers